This is...24-7 Spyz! is a five-song EP released in 1991 by a brand new lineup of 24-7 Spyz, featuring newcomers Jeff Brodnax (vocals) and Joel Maitoza (drums). The EP was released by the Spyz's new label - EastWest Records (a division of Atlantic Records) to test the marketability of the new lineup. The experiment was a success and the band released a full-length album, Strength in Numbers, the following year.

Two of the EP's five tracks would appear on that album, with the video for "Stuntman" receiving some MTV airplay and an appearance on Beavis and Butt-head. 
 
Like many 24-7 Spyz albums, the recording is out of print.

Track listing
 "Tick, Tick, Tick"
 "Stuntman"
 "My Desire"
 "Peace & Love"
 "Earthquake"

Personnel
Jeff Brodnax – vocals
Jimi Hazel – guitar, vocals
Rick Skatore – bass, vocals
Joel Maitoza – drums

1991 EPs
24-7 Spyz albums